Salomon Eduard Gubler (7 July 1845 – 6 November 1921) was a Swiss mathematician. With Johann Heinrich Graf he published Einleitung in Die Theorie Der Bessel'schen Funktionen (A Treatise on the Theory of Bessel Functions) in two volumes (1898–1900). He was the author of very appreciated textbooks on mathematics and numerous reports about the methodology and organization on mathematics teaching, and he was a member of the Swiss commission for the teaching of mathematics and founder of the Swiss association of teachers of mathematics. His main research interest was the Bessel functions.

Life and work 
Gubler graduated in the university of Bern in 1870 as Ludwig Schläfli's student. There are no records in the university about his doctoral thesis published in 1894. He spent his academic career in secondary schools, but it seems that he also taught in the University of Zurich. He retired in 1914.

References

Bibliography

External links 
 

1845 births
1921 deaths
19th-century Swiss mathematicians
20th-century Swiss mathematicians